Alex Berman (February 7, 1914 - June 29, 2000) was professor emeritus of history and of historical studies in pharmacy at the University of Cincinnati. He was a specialist in the history of French pharmacy. His papers are kept at the Lloyd Library and Museum. He was the recipient of the Kremers Award for excellence in the history of pharmacy.

Berman received a pharmacy degree from Fordham University in the 1930s. He served as a pharmacist with the United States Army Air Forces during World War II. He then studied the history of pharmacy at the University of Wisconsin where he earned his Ph.D. in 1954.

References

University of Cincinnati faculty
20th-century American historians
American male non-fiction writers
American medical historians
History of pharmacy
1914 births
2000 deaths
20th-century American male writers
Fordham University alumni
University of Wisconsin–Madison alumni
United States Army Air Forces personnel of World War II